Demeijerella palleophyton is a species of moth of the family Tortricidae first described by Józef Razowski in 2013. It is found on Seram Island in Indonesia. The habitat consists of lowland forests, bamboo and secondary forests.

The wingspan is about 19 mm. The forewings are whitish cream, the veins in the posterior third of the wing suffused with greyish. The hindwings are greyish. Females are darker, with both the markings and hindwings more brownish than in males.

Etymology
The species name refers to the pale colouration of the species and is derived from Greek palleo (meaning becoming pale) and phyton (meaning an animal).

References

Moths described in 2013
Olethreutini